Arthur J. Nozik (born 1936) is a researcher at the National Renewable Energy Lab (NREL). He is also a professor at the University of Colorado, which is located in Boulder. He researches semiconductor quantum dots at the National Renewable Energy Laboratory, and is a chemistry professor at the University of Colorado. He also does research for the advancement of solar energy, for which he won the Intergovernmental Renewable Energy Organization (IREO) Award for Science and Technology in 2009.

Biography
Dr. Arthur Nozik received his bachelor's degree in Chemical Engineering from the Cornell University in 1959, and he earned his MS and PhD in Physical Chemistry from Yale University in 1967. In 1967, he discovered a new transparent conductor (Cd2SnO4)
Thin-Film Devices, which helped develop new applications for solar energy devices. Then he did research on quantization effects in semiconductor quantum dots,  for the Allied Chemical Corporation and the American Cyanamid Corporation. He then worked as a group leader of Photoelectrochemistry from 1974 to 1978. He worked in both these places until 1978, when he joined the National Renewable Energy Laboratory (NREL). He has published a little over 150 research papers related to solar cell, quantum dot, semiconductor, silicon solar cells. He has been an editor of The Journal of Physical Chemistry since 1993 and served as Senior Editor. He has reviewed numerous papers for various scientific magazines.

Career and research
His research includes the following:
The effects of size quantization on semiconductor nanocrystals
The nanostructures of quantum dots, wells and how well they can convert solar photons
Photoelectrochemistry (the study of light through electrochemical systems) of a semiconductor molecule, and their energy conversions
Photocatalysis, which is the acceleration of a photoreaction, in the presence of a catalyst
Magnetic and electrical properties of solids

Bibliography

See also
Solar cells
Photovoltaic cells
Quantum dots
Nanostructures
Electron transfer

References 

Living people
21st-century American chemists
People associated with renewable energy
American physical chemists
Cornell University alumni
Yale University alumni
University of Colorado Boulder faculty
1936 births
People from Springfield, Massachusetts